The Maritime Operations Centre is a Bermuda government agency to provide support for maritime operations. It is located in St. George's and operates under the Department of Marine and Port Services.

It is composed of the following departments:

 Rescue Coordination Centre
 Vessel Traffic Coastal Radar Surveillance
 Coast Radio Station (Weather radio, call-sign: ZBR)
 406 MHz Beacon Registry
 Long Range Identification and Tracking
 Ship Security Alerting System
 Seaport Security and the ISPS Code

References

External links
 Maritime Operations Centre Official Home Page

Government of Bermuda
Emergency communication
Weather radio